Shihab Jahid Ali Hama Khan is an Iraqi general who serves as the incumbent commander of the Iraqi Air Force. As he is the commander of the Air Force, he represents the Air Force in the General Staff of the Iraqi Armed Forces. General Jahid Ali also is both the chairman of the board and the president of Air Force Football Club.

References 

Iraqi Air Force personnel
Iraqi Air Force air marshals
Iraqi Air Force officers
Iraqi generals
Iraqi military personnel
Iraqi military leaders
Year of birth missing (living people)
Living people